The Basketball Africa Coach of the Year Award is an annual Basketball Africa League (BAL) award given to the best coach of a given season. The award was first handed out in the 2022 season to José Neto.

Winners

References

Coach of the Year